Daur Larikovich Kvekveskiri (born 7 February 1998) is a Russian football midfielder who plays for FC Chayka Peschanokopskoye and Abkhazia national football team.

Club career
He was born in Gali, in Abhazia, Georgia. He represented the Abkhazia national football team at the 2017 ConIFA European Football Cup and he played all four games (Abkhazia finished fourth).

He made his debut in the Russian Professional Football League for FC Krasnodar-2 on 9 April 2015 in a game against FC Astrakhan.

In February 2017, after trials, Kvekveskiri signed with Serbian side FK Napredak Kruševac. Kvekveskiri made his debut in the 2016–17 Serbian SuperLiga when entering as substitute on 28th-round game played on April 1, against FK Novi Pazar.

He made his Russian Football National League debut for FC Luch Vladivostok on 7 July 2019 in a game against FC Khimki.

References

External links
 
 Profile by FNL
 

1998 births
Living people
People from Gali (town)
People from Gali District, Abkhazia
Russian people of Abkhazian descent
Abkhazian sportspeople
Russian footballers
Association football midfielders
FC Krasnodar-2 players
FK Napredak Kruševac players
FC Znamya Truda Orekhovo-Zuyevo players
FC Luch Vladivostok players
FC Yenisey Krasnoyarsk players
FC Akron Tolyatti players
FC Amkar Perm players
FC Chayka Peschanokopskoye players
Serbian SuperLiga players
Russian First League players
Russian Second League players
Russian expatriate footballers
Expatriate footballers in Serbia